Amr Ghoneim (Arabic:عمرو غنيم) is a former tennis player

Rankings
Career High ATP ranking - Singles: 261 (30-Oct-00) 
Career High Stanford ATP Doubles Ranking: 320 (13-Nov-00)

Davis Cup Statistics
He has the all-time Egyptian records for Davis cup ties played: 29
He has the all-time Egyptian records for Davis cup years played: 13

External links
 

Egyptian male tennis players
Egyptian tennis coaches
Year of birth missing (living people)
Living people
African Games medalists in tennis
African Games silver medalists for Egypt
African Games bronze medalists for Egypt
Competitors at the 1991 All-Africa Games
Competitors at the 1995 All-Africa Games